Chinatola Bazaar is a large bazaar and important business hub in Manirampur Upazila, Bangladesh.  It is situated beside the main connecting road of Jessore and Sathkhira districts.

References

Retail buildings in Bangladesh